Wheelchair tennis at the 1992 Summer Paralympics consisted of four events.

Medal summary 

Source: Paralympic.org

Medal table

References 

 

 
1992 Summer Paralympics events
1992
Paralympics